The 1921 Tulane Green Wave football team was an American football team that represented Tulane University as a member of the Southern Intercollegiate Athletic Association (SIAA) during the 1921 college football season. In its first year under head coach Myron Fuller, Tulane compiled a 4–6 record.

Schedule

References

Tulane
Tulane Green Wave football seasons
Tulane Green Wave football